M.H. Hoffman (March 21, 1881 – March 8, 1944) was an American film producer. He is particularly associated with Poverty Row where his companies such as Allied Pictures and Liberty Pictures produced an output consisting of mainly low-budget B pictures. Some sources suggest he died in 1938, the year he produced his last films for release by Grand National Pictures.

Selected filmography
 Suspicion (1918)
 Broadway Gold (1923)
 The Drums of Jeopardy (1923)
 Let's Go (1923)
Daring Love (1924)
 In Fast Company (1924)
 Three in Exile (1925)
 Pals (1925)
 Husband Hunters (1927)
 One Hour of Love (1927)
 Ex-Flame (1930)
 Forgotten Women (1931)
 The She-Wolf (1931)
 The Thirteenth Guest (1932)
 The Stoker (1932)
 Officer Thirteen (1932)
 A Parisian Romance (1932)
 File 113 (1933)
 The Eleventh Commandment (1933)
 West of Singapore (1933)
 One Year Later (1933)
 Take the Stand (1934)
Once to Every Bachelor (1934)
 Cheaters (1934)
 Without Children (1935)
 The Old Homestead (1935)
 Champagne for Breakfast (1935)
 The Spanish Cape Mystery (1935)
 King of the Sierras (1938)

References

Bibliography
 Michael R. Pitts. Poverty Row Studios, 1929–1940: An Illustrated History of 55 Independent Film Companies, with a Filmography for Each. McFarland & Company, 2005.

External links

1881 births
1944 deaths
American film producers
Businesspeople from Illinois
20th-century American businesspeople